Pedumispora is a genus of fungi in the class Dothideomycetes. The relationship of this taxon to other taxa within the class is unknown (incertae sedis).

References

Dothideomycetes enigmatic taxa
Dothideomycetes genera